Henry Howard, 3rd Earl of Effingham (7 February 1837 – 4 May 1898) was an English peer, styled Lord Howard from 1845 to 1889.

He was educated at Harrow and Christ Church, Oxford, and served as a cornet in the Oxfordshire Yeomanry.

On 31 October 1865, he married Victoria Francesca Boyer (d. 1899), by whom he had one son:
Henry Alexander Gordon Howard, 4th Earl of Effingham (1866–1927)

He is buried in Kensal Green Cemetery in London slightly west of the main chapel.

Henry succeeded him as Earl on his death in 1898.

References

External links

1837 births
1898 deaths
19th-century British Army personnel
Alumni of Christ Church, Oxford
Henry Howard, 03rd Earl of Effingham
Earls in the Peerage of the United Kingdom
People educated at Harrow School
Queen's Own Oxfordshire Hussars officers
Earls of Effingham
Burials at Kensal Green Cemetery
Barons Howard of Effingham